The Ballisodare River (also spelled Ballysadare) is a river in Ireland, flowing through County Sligo.

Course
The Ballisodare River derives from three other Sligo rivers: the Unshin River, the Owenmore River and the Owenbeg River. It flows through Ballysadare, passing under the N4 and N59 roads.

Wildlife

The Ballisodare River is a noted salmon and trout fishery, with the pools under Ballysadare Falls a favourite spot.

See also
Rivers of Ireland

References

Rivers of County Sligo